Androuet du Cerceau was a family of French architects and designers active in the 16th and early 17th century.

Family members include:
 Jacques I Androuet du Cerceau (1510–1584), architect, designer, and engraver
 Baptiste Androuet du Cerceau (1544/47–1590), architect who designed the Pont Neuf, son of Jacques I
 Jacques II Androuet du Cerceau (1550–1614), architect, son of Jacques I
 Charles Androuet du Cerceau (died 1600), architect and engineer, son of Jacques I
 Salomon de Brosse (1571–1626), architect, grandson of Jacques I
 Jean Androuet du Cerceau (ca 1585–1649), architect and engineer, son of Baptiste
 Paul Androuet du Cerceau (1623–1710), goldsmith and engraver, grandson of Jacques II
 Gabriel-Guillaume Androuet du Cerceau (fl 1697–1743), architect, designer, and painter; grandson of Jacques II

See also

 Catherine de' Medici's building projects

References

 Baldus, Eduoard (n. d. [c. 1880]). Oeuvre de Jacques Androuet dit du Cerceau. Meubles. Paris; Edouard Baldus.
 Miller, Naomi (1996). "Du Cerceau. French family of artists.", vol. 9, pp. 350–354, in The Dictionary of Art, edited by Jane Turner, reprinted with minor corrections in 1998. New York: Grove. .

External links

 George Goodall, "Besson and du Cerceau" 2005: Jacques I Androuet du Cerceau's partnership with designer and mechanician Jacques Besson
 Du Cerceau's Books on line: https://web.archive.org/web/20070420012058/http://www.cesr.univ-tours.fr/architectura/Traite/Auteur/Androuet_du_Cerceau.asp

16th-century French architects
17th-century French architects
French architecture writers
Huguenots